KRTC may refer to:

 KRTC (FM), a radio station (88.7 FM) licensed to serve Truth or Consequence, New Mexico, United States; see List of radio stations in New Mexico
 Kaohsiung Rapid Transit Corporation